Wordaholics is a comedy panel show hosted by Gyles Brandreth. It started airing on BBC Radio 4 in 2012. The third series was transmitted in September 2014.

Format
There are toponyms, abbreviations, euphemisms, old words, new words, cockney rhyming slang, Greek gobbledegook, plus the panellists' picks of the ugliest and the most beautiful words. It's the whole world of words in 28 minutes. Find out the meaning of words like giff-gaff, knock-knobbler and buckfitches; the difference between French marbles, French velvet and the French ache and hear the glorious poetry of the English language, as practiced by writers ranging from William Shakespeare to Vanilla Ice.

The rounds include:
 "Letter of the Week"
 "Not in so Many Words"
 "New Words for Old"
 "You Can't Say That"

Guests
Guests include Alex Horne, Alun Cochrane, Arthur Smith, Dave Gorman, Ed Byrne, Hannah Gadsby, Helen Keen, Holly Walsh, Jack Whitehall, Jenny Eclair, Josh Widdicombe, Katy Brand, Lloyd Langford, Michael Rosen, Milton Jones, Natalie Haynes, Paul Sinha, Richard Herring, Robin Ince, Stephen Fry, Susie Dent.

Episodes

References

2012 radio programme debuts
British radio game shows
2010s British game shows
British panel games